The Moved-Outers is a 1945 children's novel written by Florence Crannell Means and illustrated by Helen Blair. The book received a Newbery Honor and the Bank Street Children's Book Award (now called the Josette Frank Award) in 1946.

The theme of the novel is the treatment of Japanese Americans on the West Coast during World War II. The story centers on Sumiko (Sue) Ohara, a high school senior from Cordova, California. It describes the internment of herself, her brother Kim, and her mother in Amache, Colorado, while her father is sent to North Dakota. During her stay there, she falls in love with a neighbor from Cordova, Jiro Ito. The novel ends in 1943, with the war still in progress, as Jiro and Kim join the army, and Sue and Jiro's sister go to college. The book stresses the patriotism of the ordinary Japanese American.

"We're really the newest pioneers," Sue said in a hushed voice. "We, the evacuees, the moved-outers. We're American patriots, loving our country with our hearts broken. And those who must can be pioneers behind barbed wire, but those who can must go out and pioneer in the wide world."

Bibliography
; reprint Walker, 1993,

References

External links
Brian Niiya, The Moved-Outers Densho Encyclopedia

1945 American novels
American children's novels
Books about the internment of Japanese Americans
Novels set during World War II
Newbery Honor-winning works
Houghton Mifflin books
1945 children's books
Rancho Cordova, California